Perodicticinae is a subfamily of the family Lorisidae. It includes five species of African primates as shown under taxonomy below. 

They have a vestigial tail and index finger. The snout is pointed and the ears and eyes are large. The coat is dense, brown and woolly.

Taxonomy
 Family Lorisidae
 Subfamily Perodicticinae
 Genus Arctocebus
 Calabar angwantibo, Arctocebus calabarensis
 Golden angwantibo, Arctocebus aureus
 Genus Perodicticus
 Central African potto, Perodictitus edwardsi
East African potto, Perodicticus ibeanus
West African potto, Perodicticus potto
 Subfamily Lorisinae
The false potto (Pseudopotto martini) is now thought to be a misidentified individual of a Perodicticus species.

References

External links 

Lorises and galagos
Primates of Africa
Mammal subfamilies
Taxa named by John Edward Gray
Taxa described in 1870